Santee Branch is a stream in the U.S. state of Mississippi.

Santee is a name either derived from the Choctaw language meaning "snake", or a transfer from the Santee River, in South Carolina.

References

Rivers of Mississippi
Rivers of Jefferson Davis County, Mississippi
Rivers of Covington County, Mississippi
Mississippi placenames of Native American origin